Dillon Barnes (born 8 April 1996) is a professional footballer who plays as a goalkeeper most recently for Championship club Queens Park Rangers. Born in England, he represents the Jamaica national team.

Barnes began his career with Barnet and later Fulham. He failed to make a first-team appearance for either club. He was loaned to Farnborough in late 2014, making his competitive debut in the Conference South, making 14 appearances. He left Fulham in summer 2015, briefly joining Bedford Town before signing for Colchester United following a trial. He made his professional debut in August 2016 for Colchester. He was loaned to Welling United in August 2017 and then Hemel Hempstead Town in January 2018.

Career
Born in Enfield Town, London, Barnes began his career with Barnet where he first featured on the bench for the first-team during the 2012–13 season. He moved to Fulham for the 2014–15 season, and he was loaned out to Conference South side Farnborough for the second half of the season. He made eleven appearances for Farnborough between December 2014 and April 2015.

In summer 2015, Barnes joined Bedford Town before joining League One club Colchester United on trial in August. He kept one clean sheet in three games for the under-21s before being offered a one-year development contract which he signed on 1 September.

Barnes missed an opportunity to make his professional debut on 8 May 2016, in Colchester's final game of the 2015–16 season after getting caught in traffic, meaning teammate James Bransgrove was selected for the game ahead of him for his own debut. Barnes eventually made his debut for Colchester on 9 August 2016, when he was named in the starting line-up for their EFL Cup match against Brighton & Hove Albion. He conceded four goals as Colchester lost to their Championship opponents 4–0. In his next game on 8 November, in the EFL Trophy, Barnes saved two penalties during the penalty shoot-out with Charlton Athletic to help his side to a 4–3 win and an additional bonus point.

National League South side Welling United signed Barnes in an initial one-month loan deal on 8 August 2017. He made his Welling debut in their 1–0 defeat by Chelmsford City the same day. On 8 September, his loan was extended to run until 8 November.

In January 2018, Barnes signed on an initial one-month loan for National League South side Hemel Hempstead Town.

On 28 April 2018, Barnes made his English Football League debut, standing in for Sam Walker for Colchester's League Two game against Swindon Town. He kept a clean sheet in the 0–0 draw.

Following Sam Walker's summer move to Reading, Barnes was handed Colchester United's number one shirt. He started in Colchester's first game of the 2018–19 season, keeping a clean sheet in a 0–0 draw with Notts County. He was sent off for the first time in his career on 22 April, after being shown a red card for violent conduct during Colchester's 1–1 draw at Yeovil Town.

Queens Park Rangers
On 22 July 2019, Barnes joined Championship side Queens Park Rangers on a two-year deal.

Hibernian (loan)
He was loaned to Scottish club Hibernian in September 2020. Barnes made his debut in the Scottish League Cup, playing the duration of a 3–1 victory over Brora Rangers. On 4 January 2021, Barnes was recalled by Queens Park Rangers, after only three months on loan at Hibernian.

Burton Albion (loan)
On 18 January 2021, Barnes joined League One bottom side Burton Albion on loan until the end of the 2020–21 season.

Yeovil Town (loan)
On 1 January 2022, Barnes joined National League club Yeovil Town on a short-term loan deal.

Aldershot Town (loan)
On 12 February 2022, Barnes joined National League side Aldershot Town on loan until the end of the 2021–22 season. On 11 March 2022, Barnes' loan spell was cut short a month in, with the Jamaican international leaving the club following four first-team appearances.

International career
Barnes was called up to represent the Jamaica national team for a pair of friendlies in June 2021. On 1 July 2021 Barnes was named to the squad for the 2021 CONCACAF Gold Cup. He made his official debut on 20 July in Jamaica's final group stage game against Costa Rica.

Career statistics

Club

International

References

External links
Dillon Barnes profile at the official Colchester United F.C. website

1996 births
Living people
Footballers from Enfield, London
English footballers
English sportspeople of Jamaican descent
Citizens of Jamaica through descent
Jamaican footballers
Jamaica international footballers
Association football goalkeepers
Barnet F.C. players
Beckenham Town F.C. players
Fulham F.C. players
Farnborough F.C. players
Bedford Town F.C. players
Colchester United F.C. players
Welling United F.C. players
Hemel Hempstead Town F.C. players
National League (English football) players
Southern Football League players
English Football League players
Hibernian F.C. players
Burton Albion F.C. players
Yeovil Town F.C. players
Aldershot Town F.C. players
Scottish Professional Football League players
Black British sportspeople
2021 CONCACAF Gold Cup players